Interstate 49 (I-49) is an Interstate Highway that spans  in a north–south direction in the US state of Louisiana. It runs from I-10 in Lafayette to the Arkansas state line north of Shreveport, largely paralleling the older U.S. Highway 71 (US 71) corridor, and connects the state's two east–west Interstates at two of its metropolitan centers. Along the way, it serves the cities of Opelousas, Alexandria, and Natchitoches, intersecting several cross-state highways, such as I-20, US 190, US 167, US 165, and US 84.

I-49 was an intrastate Interstate Highway until December 12, 2012, when the designation was officially approved for an upgraded portion of US 71 in Missouri running from Joplin north to Kansas City. A southern extension of the route from Lafayette to New Orleans is planned along the US 90 corridor.

Route description

I-49 begins its journey in Lafayette concurrent with US 167 from I-10 to Opelousas at exit 23. At Lafayette, motorists continuing southbound see the Interstate Highway change to US 90 (Evangeline Thruway), a major thoroughfare taking travelers toward the heart of Lafayette. North of Lafayette, motorists on I-49 will parallel the ancient Mississippi river bed north of Carencro, and through Grand Coteau, just south of Opelousas.

After leaving Opelousas, I-49 traverses the relatively flat, fertile farmlands until reaching Alexandria. From there, the highway roughly follows the Red River and Louisiana Highway 1 (LA 1), bypassing the historic city of Natchitoches to the west on its way to Shreveport. At Shreveport, the highway parallels a railroad line just to the west until its terminus at I-20 southwest of downtown.

On the northside of Shreveport, the route resumes at I-220 before having interchanges with LA 3194 and LA 1 before traveling northward through Caddo Parish, passing between the small communities of Gilliam and Hosston. I-49 crosses the Arkansas state line just north of Ida and proceeds toward the city of Texarkana.

The heaviest traffic on I-49 occurs within the cities of Shreveport and Opelousas. The stretch of freeway in Shreveport sees an average of 70,000 vehicles per day, while the stretch of freeway between Lafayette and Carencro sees an average of 55,000 vehicles per day, and the stretch of freeway through Opelousas sees an average of 45,000 vehicles per day between the Judson Walsh Drive and Creswell Lane exits.

History
The original plans for Interstate Highways in Louisiana only included I-10 and I-20 with no connection in between. After I-55 was added in the 1950s, the state considered building a toll road to connect I-10 in southwestern Louisiana and I-20 in the northern part of the state but later rejected the idea.

In the mid-1970s, the Federal Highway Administration (FHWA) approved an Interstate Highway to run between I-10 and I-20, beginning at I-10 in Lafayette and ending at I-20 in Shreveport.

Construction of I-49 began in 1978, with the first signed segment running concurrent with US 167 from I-10 to US 190 in Opelousas, opening in July 1982. Shortly afterwards, an additional section was opened to Washington. After several delays, most of the highway was open by the early 1990s. The entire length of the  road was completed May 1, 1996, when a  section of highway in Alexandria, named the Martin Luther King Jr. Highway, was completed. The total cost of I-49's construction was about $1.38 billion (equivalent to $ in ).

I-49 North is a  construction project that will connect I-220 in Shreveport to the Arkansas state line and has been divided into 11 segments. On November 27, 2013, the first  section between LA 1 and US 71 opened to traffic; the section to just south of the Arkansas state line opened in March 2014. The segment from Shreveport to the Arkansas state line was opened in early 2015. The portion between I-220 and LA 1, which includes an interchange with LA 3194, was estimated to be completed in early 2018. On May 31, 2017,  of this section, extending from LA 3194 to LA 1, was opened only to northbound traffic. On June 15, 2018, the entire  portion of I-49 between I-220 and LA 1, including an interchange with I-220, was opened to traffic. On October 17, 2018, the remaining interchange ramps were opened to traffic, making I-49 continuous from I-220 in Shreveport to the Arkansas state line.

Future

I-49 Geaux South
The Louisiana Department of Transportation and Development (DOTD) is currently working to extend I-49 from its current terminus in Lafayette south and east to New Orleans along the existing US 90 corridor. The project is officially referred to as the "Interstate 49 Geaux South" program, or more commonly, "I-49 South". This portion of US 90 is presently a divided four- and six-lane highway with several sections of freeway completed between Broussard and Raceland. In the New Orleans area, I-49 is planned to follow U.S. Highway 90 Business (US 90 Bus., the Westbank Expressway) through Westwego, Gretna, and across the Mississippi River via the Crescent City Connection to a terminus at I-10 in the New Orleans Central Business District.  "Future I-49" signage is visible along this portion of the corridor, although, construction has yet to begin. If this extension is completed, I-49 will meet I-10 twice, but there are many obstacles in the completion of the I-49 corridor in Louisiana. Cost has been an ongoing issue from the beginning, and this only increases yearly. In September 2015, however, DOTD Secretary Sherri H. LeBas stated, "Completing I-49 South is a top priority for DOTD".

In the Lafayette area, the project is divided into two projects, the "I-49 Connector" and the rest of the Interstate from the Lafayette Regional Airport to LA 88. The I-49 Connector has a record of decision and is currently in the process of formulating the Environmental Impact Study. It is projected to follow the existing path of the Evangeline Thruway, a divided six-lane surface roadway that passes just to the east of the downtown area. Much of the proposed  will be elevated and is expected to cost between $750 and $850 million, making it the costliest portion of the entire  route to be constructed. , engineer planning has not begun nor has funding been secured for the project. The remainder of the distance between the airport and LA 88 is planned to be a six-lane at-grade freeway with a  segment of eight-lane elevated freeway through the neighboring city of Broussard. The planning is in cooperation with the Lafayette Metropolitan Planning Organization (MPO).

In April 2015, DOTD accepted proposals for an upcoming design-build project to construct an interchange at the junction of US 90 and LA 318, which is located in St. Mary Parish between Jeanerette and Baldwin. LA 318 travels southward from the St. Mary Sugar Co-Op on LA 182 at Sorrel and crosses US 90 at grade on the way to the Port of West St. Mary. The interchange is one of many projects along the projected I-49 corridor that is expected to improve traffic flow, safety, and hurricane evacuation.  On April 27, 2018, DOTD celebrated the opening of the junction of US 90 and LA 318 with a ribbon-cutting ceremony.

LaDOTD started construction of US 90 (I-49 S) and Albertson's Pkwy. Construction began in 2014 and finished in 2019. The Albertson Parkway section of the project completed construction in October 2019.

On August 22, 2022, the LaDOTD announced the start of a $136.52 million project to construct a new interchange at Ambassador Caffery Pkwy and US 90 (future I-49).  On November 14, 2022, Governor John Bel Edwards was joined by LaDOTD along with other state and local officials to celebrate the start of the Ambassador Caffery Interchange in Broussard.

Shreveport area
DOTD is also in the process of closing the last gap in the "I-49 North" project between I-20 and I-220 in Shreveport. A direct connection through Shreveport, known as the Inner City Connector, is controversial since its path is projected to pass through the residential Allendale neighborhood, which would necessitate the displacement of many of its residents. A no-build alternative would route through traffic via the existing LA 3132 (Inner Loop Expressway) and I-220 alignments after necessary improvements to those highways are carried out. On March 5, 2016, a small group of Allendale residents, known as the LOOP-IT group, held a rally to protest against the Inner City Connector but voiced support for a business boulevard serving local traffic.

Exit list

See also

Notes

References

External links

Maps / GIS Data Homepage, Louisiana Department of Transportation and Development
I-49 North Project Home Page at La DOTD
I-49 Inner-City Connector-Shreveport

 Louisiana
49
Transportation in Avoyelles Parish, Louisiana
Transportation in Caddo Parish, Louisiana
Transportation in DeSoto Parish, Louisiana
Transportation in Evangeline Parish, Louisiana
Transportation in Lafayette Parish, Louisiana
Transportation in Natchitoches Parish, Louisiana
Transportation in Rapides Parish, Louisiana
Transportation in St. Landry Parish, Louisiana